This is a list of catchphrases found in British and American television and film, where a catchphrase is a short phrase or expression that has gained usage beyond its initial scope. These are not merely catchy sayings. Even though some sources may identify a phrase as a catchphrase, this list is for those that meet the definition given in the lead section of the catchphrase article and are notable for their widespread use within the culture.

This list is distinct from the list of political catchphrases.

In British culture

In American television 

Catchphrases from events, interviews, and commercials are not included.

In cinema

See also 
 AFI's 100 Years...100 Movie Quotes
 List of Internet memes

Notes

References

External links 

Mass media lists